The Lübecker Nachrichten (LN; German for Lübeck News) is a regional daily newspaper in Germany, covering Schleswig-Holstein and western Mecklenburg-Vorpommern. It is, along with the Schleswig-Holsteinischer Zeitungsverlag and the Kieler Nachrichten, one of the largest daily newspapers in Schleswig-Holstein.

LN appears daily except on Mondays and days after holidays. It was formed in 1946 from the Lübecker General-Anzeiger founded in 1832 (Lübeck General-Gazette), a title it still uses for its local Lübeck supplement.

The paper is published by Lübecker Nachrichten GmbH, headquartered in the Buntekuh district of Lübeck and 49% owned by Axel Springer AG. 
Editor-in-chief is Manfred von Thien.

References

External links

 Online edition and news portal
 Publisher site with business and subscription information about the newspaper

Daily newspapers published in Germany
German-language newspapers
Mass media in Lübeck
Mecklenburg-Vorpommern
1946 establishments in Germany
Newspapers established in 1946
German news websites